Jonas is an American sitcom created as a Disney Channel Original Series. The series premiered on May 2, 2009 as Jonas for its first season, and was renamed Jonas L.A. for its second season ending on October 3, 2010 with 34 episodes produced.

Series overview

Episodes

Season 1 (2009–10)

Season 2 (2010)

References 

Jonas Brothers
Lists of American children's television series episodes
Lists of Disney Channel television series episodes
Lists of American sitcom episodes